This is a list of mayors of North Nicosia (Nicosia Turkish Municipality), Northern Cyprus.

Mayors (1958-2013) 
 Tahsin Gözmen: 1958-1962
 Cevdet Mirata: 1962-1962
 Fuat Celalettin: 1962-1968
 Ziver Kemal: 1969-1976
 Mustafa Akıncı: 1976-1990
 Burhan Yetkili: 1990-1994
 Şemi Bora: 1994-2002
 Kutlay Erk: 2002-2006
 Cemal Metin Bulutoğluları: 2006–2013
 Kadri Fellahoğlu: 2013-2014
 Mehmet Harmancı: 2014-present

 
Nicosia